Brooks and Hewitt Halls are historic dormitory buildings located on the campus of Barnard College in Morningside Heights, New York, New York. Brooks Hall was designed by Charles A. Rich (1854–1943) and built in 1906–1907. It is a seven and one half story, red Harvard brick building on a granite foundation with limestone and terra cotta trim. It features a sloping Spanish tile roof with hip-roof dormer windows. Hewitt Hall, named for Abram S. Hewitt, was designed by McKim, Mead & White and built in 1926–1927. It is a seven-story, red Harvard brick building with a sloping copper clad roof.

They were listed on the National Register of Historic Places in 2003.

See also
Barnard Hall
Milbank, Brinckerhoff, and Fiske Halls

References

Residential buildings on the National Register of Historic Places in Manhattan
Colonial Revival architecture in New York (state)
Renaissance Revival architecture in New York City
Residential buildings completed in 1906
Columbia University campus
Morningside Heights, Manhattan
McKim, Mead & White buildings
1906 establishments in New York City
Barnard College